The 2026 Rhineland-Palatinate state election will be held in 2026 to elect the 19th Landtag of Rhineland-Palatinate.

Background 
In the 2021 state elections, the SPD, led by Prime Minister Malu Dreyer, was the strongest with 35.7 percent. The CDU achieved its poor result in Rhineland-Palatinate with 27.7 percent. The Greens were again the third strongest force with gains of 9.3 percent.

The AfD became the fourth strongest force in the Rhineland-Palatinate state parliament with losses of 8.3 percent. The FDP reached 5.5 percent. The Free Voters made it into the state parliament for the first time with 5.4 percent.

Even before the election, all three parties in the traffic light coalition had campaigned for it to continue. The balance of power within the alliance changed, since the Greens were now the second strongest party instead of the FDP.

The SPD invited the Greens and FDP to exploratory talks the day after the election. Almost eight weeks after the election, the SPD, Greens and FDP agreed to continue their previous coalition.

In the constituent session of the state parliament on May 18, 2021, Malu Dreyer was re-elected Prime Minister and the Third Dreyer cabinet was sworn in.

Opinion polls

References

See also 

2026 elections in Germany
Elections in Rhineland-Palatinate